The Old School Room in Chew Magna, Somerset, England was built around 1510. It is a Grade II* listed building.

It was built as a church house for the neighbouring Church of St Andrew. The upstairs room was the local school from the mid or early 15th century, with the village poorhouse below. The ground floor was divided into cubicles which housed the destitute and occasionally prisoners. It also served as the meeting place of the Court leet.

The building was declared unsafe in 1965. In 1971 the building underwent major renovation, which included replacement of oak beams supporting the upper floor were replaced and preservation work on the wooden roof carried out. The building was then used as a youth club until it was purchased by the parish council in 1981 as a village hall. Since then it has been a venue for social activity in the village.

References

External links
 

Grade II* listed buildings in Bath and North East Somerset